"In for a Penny" is a 1975 single by Slade from Nobody's Fools.

In for a Penny or In For a Penny may also refer to 
In for a Penny (game show), a British television programme
"In for a Penny...", a 2011 season 6 episode of American series Psych
"In for a Penny", 2004 season 1 episode of Canadian series  Zixx
In for a Penny, 1981 album from Arabesque

See also
In for a Penny, In for a Pound (disambiguation)